Endukante... Premanta! is a 2012 Indian Telugu-language fantasy romantic comedy film written and directed by A. Karunakaran. Produced by Sravanthi Ravi Kishore, the film stars Ram and Tamannaah. It features music scored by G. V. Prakash Kumar and dialogues by Kona Venkat. The film is released theatrically on 8 June 2012.

The film deals with love between two souls across two different eras. Both Ram and Tamannah play dual roles in the film, with each of those pairs of roles set in 1980 and 2012 respectively. This film's plot is inspired by the American film Just like Heaven (2005). Endukante... Premanta! was simultaneously shot in Tamil as Yen Endral Kadhal Enben! but the Tamil version never saw a theatrical release.

Plot
  
The film begins with Vizag being shown in 1980 in which a ladies college bus makes its scheduled bus stop. Krishna, standing at the bus stop, keeps looking at Srinidhi, whom he loves, but does not express it. He has been doing that for the last three years but without any response from her. Srinidhi also likes Krishna but does not reveal it, as she fears that by doing so, she may put her family in trouble. On the last day of the college, Krishna decides to propose to her, so he disguises himself in a 'burqa' and boards the bus. However, the bus conductor recognises him and forces the bus driver to stop the bus. However, before he could stop it, the bus gets involved in an accident. Krishna saves Srinidhi from the mishap but is killed in the process. Shocked about Krishna's death, Srinidhi dies at his grave.

The film moves to 2012 in Paris, where Sravanthi, daughter of the Indian Ambassador to France and a medical student, is leading a stifling life due to her father's security around her. She wants to break away from this life and live with freedom. She fantasizes an unidentified person in her dream every day, falls for him, and she promises her friends to marry him if her dream comes true, whoever he may be. One day, when her father had to leave the country due to his professional commitments, she stealthily escapes from her home and goes on a tour of the whole countryside with her friends and is able to free herself at last from the security around her.

Ram is a happy-go-lucky guy who is a headache to his father as he does not take life seriously. So his father tricks him and sends him to Paris for a job, which he arranges through his friend Pulla Reddy without Ram's knowledge. One day, Ram sees Sravanthi standing on a railing of the bridge over a river and forces her to get down. They soon get acquainted, and friendship blossoms between them. Meanwhile, Sravanthi's father is worried that she has not returned since he left and asks his Chief Security Officer DK to find her. Sravanthi and Ram both want to leave for India. Ram gets his passport by bluffing Sravanthi's father. However, at the airport, he is not able to find Sravanthi and leaves for India alone. After reaching India, he finds Sravanthi to his surprise at the airport. She tells him to meet a specific doctor in a specific hospital and disappears. On meeting the doctor, he finds Sravanthi in the hospital ICU. Sravanthi reveals that Ram has been talking to her soul. She went into a coma after an accident, which was a part of conspiracy hatched by DK and his agent in India, Koka Bhai. Only Ram can see and hear her, owing to their previous lives.

Ram protects Sravanthi's body when he notices that any harm to her body will harm the soul, by taking her to his aunt's hospital. His aunt tells him that she can survive and come out of coma if and only if a German medicine is given three doses at exactly the same time (every two days) but at different periods. She goes to a very powerful person who can sense beneath the lives and asks him why only Ram can see Sravanthi. The person tells her it is the will of god and after she goes from there he replies to his student that this is happening because Ram and Sravanthi's love failed since the past six lives and it wants to fulfil itself in this last life.

The first dose is given to Sravanthi's body without much of a problem. Meanwhile, DK tries to kill Sravanthi by having her body kidnapped, but Ram is able to rescue her body and give the second dose. In the end, DK gets hold of Ram when he goes to get the last dose of medicine. After a fight, Sravanthi is given the third and last dose but DK removes the oxygen cylinder and its supply to Sravanthi. He somehow saves her and she recovers, but fails to recognise Ram. Sravanthi's father arrives at the very moment and gets Ram arrested for cheating him, but he later apologises to Ram after learning of the risk he faced to save his daughter, and gets ready to leave Paris that night with Sravanthi. Their car tyre gets punctured and meanwhile, Sravanthi sees the same location she witnesses in her dream and also sees a person kicking a coke tin which hits her. When she goes towards him to see him, the person is none other than Ram. Sravanthi is surprised to this and when she touches Ram's hand she recollects everything that happened between them this life even in her soul form and expresses her love by hugging him. At last, they both get married.

Cast

 Ram in a dual role as Ram and Krishna
 Tamannaah in a dual role as Sravanthi and Srinidhi
 Rishi as DK
 Suman as Sravanthi's father and the Indian Ambassador to France
 Sayaji Shinde as Ram's father
 Y. Kasi Viswanath as a chef at Sravanthi's house
 Anu Hasan as Ram's aunt
 Kona Venkat as Koka Bhai, the Indian agent of DK
 Brahmanandam as Pandu Ranga Rao
 Satya Krishnan as Dr. Savitha
 Nagineedu as Pulla Reddy
 Raghu Babu as Johnny
 Suman Setty as Kumar

Production
The film was to be originally produced by Paruchuri Prasad. However, he backed out in the last minute due to budget constraints. Sravanthi Ravi Kishore and Ram decided to do the film "at any cost as this script has the potential to be made as a bilingual". The shooting of the movie started at the end of July 2011 and it took the crew of the film 118 days to complete. The film was shot in Geneva, Switzerland and France over a period of 60 days. The film was shot simultaneously in Tamil and was named Yen Endral Kadhal Enben, with each shot remade twice. Incidentally, this was Ram's debut film in Tamil. Ram had to learn gymnastics to shoot for a song which delayed the shoot for two months. Kona Venkat, who is the dialogue writer for the film, made his debut in this film as one of the antagonists. "After narrating the dialogues of my character", says Venkat, Karunakaran was convinced that "he could only see me and insisted that I do it". Rishi was selected to play the character of DK, a security commander and the main antagonist, in the film. "This is a new dimension, as a villain I missed dancing with the heroines but I believe that a villain should have a strong aim" says Rishi, who previously played the lead roles in films like A Film By Aravind, Bhagyalakshmi Bumper Draw.

Release
Endukante... Premanta! received a U certificate from the Censor Board of Film Certification without cuts. It was scheduled to release on 11 May 2012. But release was postponed as it coincided with the release date of Pavan Kalyan-starrer Gabbar Singh. The film was finally released worldwide on 8 June 2012. In the United States, it was distributed by 14 Reels Entertainment.

Reception
The film mostly received mixed reviews. Idlebrain.com didn't give any rating for the film but criticised that the "screenplay is not gripping, romance feel is ineffective and run-time is excessive for this kind of subject". Rediff.com has given a rating of 1.5 out of a scale of 5 for the film and declared that "Endukante Premanta disappoints". It criticised the script for its "loopholes" but praised the lead pair of Ram and Tamannah as the "heart and soul of the film". Oneindia.com said that it's "Ram's show" and that "if only the youngsters enjoy the slow pace then it is sure to be another hit for Ram and Karunakaran". Bharatstudent.com had given a rating of 2.75/5 for the film and suggested that it "could have been better". Greatandhra.com had given 2.5/5 for the film and described it as "a soul shuttling between death, coma and life". Cinegoer criticised the director of the film and said that the film "is downright ridiculous, we'd rather see his montage shots on Youtube than sit through this montage film". The Times of India rated the film at 2.5/5 and said that the film is "overall, a very underwhelming experience that only comes off in bits and pieces". The Hindu criticised the film to be "like a montage of different films" and director for "throwing logic to the wind", but praised the lead pair of the film for having "done their best to bring some semblance of reality to this fantasy". CNN-IBN too felt that the film "is far from being perfect" and that "the climax is not one bit convincing". However it praised the cast for its performance and the director for his "bold experiment".

Soundtrack

The audio of the film was released on 29 April 2012 and launch of the audio was held at annapurna studios on same day. G. V. Prakash Kumar composed the soundtrack, which received positive response. Musicperk.com rated it 7.5/10 quoting "A refreshing musical album which is cool, lovely, soft, breezy, lively and yet trendy".

References

External links
 

2012 films
Films directed by A. Karunakaran
Indian multilingual films
2010s Tamil-language films
Films scored by G. V. Prakash Kumar
Indian romantic fantasy films
2010s Telugu-language films
2012 fantasy films
2010s romantic fantasy films
Indian romantic comedy films